Improved military rifle propellants are tubular nitrocellulose propellants evolved from World War I through World War II for loading military and commercial ammunition and sold to civilians for reloading rifle ammunition for hunting and target shooting.  These propellants were DuPont modifications of United States artillery propellants. DuPont miniaturized the large artillery grains to form military rifle propellants suitable for use in small arms. These were improved during the first world war to be more efficient in rimless military cartridges replacing earlier rimmed rifle cartridges. Four-digit numbers identified experimental propellants, and a few successful varieties warranted extensive production by several manufacturers. Some were used almost exclusively for military contracts, or commercial ammunition production, but a few have been distributed for civilian use in handloading. Improved military rifle propellants are coated with dinitrotoluene (DNT) to slow initial burning and graphite to minimize static electricity during blending and loading.  They contain 0.6% diphenylamine as a stabilizer and 1% potassium sulfate to reduce muzzle flash.

Reaction mechanism 
John Bernadou patented a single-base propellant while working at the Naval Torpedo Station in 1897. Bernadou's colloid of nitrocellulose with ether and alcohol was formulated for the reaction pressures generated within naval artillery. The colloid was extruded in dense cylinders with longitudinal perforations to decompose in accordance with Piobert's law. If all external surfaces of the grain are ignited simultaneously, the grain reacts inward from the outside of the cylinder (creating a reaction area of decreasing size), and outward from each perforation (creating a reaction area of increasing size.) Propellant decomposition is initiated by heat causing the colloid to melt and form bubbles of reactive gas which decompose in a luminous exothermic reaction after the bubbles burst.  Rate of reaction is controlled by heat transfer through the temperature gradient from the luminous reacting gas through the bubbles to the intact colloid. Heat transfer (and rate of reaction) is faster if the bubbles are under pressure, because heat transfer is more efficient through smaller bubbles. These propellants may not react satisfactorily at low pressures within the oxygen-deficient atmosphere of a gun barrel.

Adaptation for use in military rifles 
The United States Navy licensed use of the patent to DuPont for production of artillery propellant for ships operating in the Atlantic, and to California Powder Works for ships operating in the Pacific. The United States Army also used Bernadou's propellant for artillery and for the new M1903 Springfield service rifle in 1909 with the  M1906 bullet. Grain size varied with bore diameter. The Army identified this military rifle propellant as Pyro DG (for diphenylamine, graphited), and 500 tons per day were manufactured by various plants through the first world war.

Package labeling 
Military rifle propellant was manufactured in batches in a procedure taking about two weeks from treating cotton linters with nitric acid, through curing the extruded grains to evaporate excess ether and alcohol, and finally coating the dried grains with DNT and graphite. Each batch had somewhat different reaction rates, so testing was required to determine the appropriate charge to generate required reaction pressure in the intended cartridge. Test results were forwarded to the factory or arsenal assembling cartridges. Propellants packaged in small sheet metal canisters for sale to civilians were labeled Military Rifle Powder to distinguish the product from low-density "bulk" propellants intended to react at lower pressures in shotguns or pistols and from Sporting Rifle Powder for early lever-action rifles unable to withstand the pressures of 20th-century service rifle cartridges. Charges of low-density "bulk" propellants were often similar to the volumes of gunpowder used in older firearms and reaction rates were less variable at low pressures appropriate for those cartridges; but each batch of military rifle propellant required a different canister label specifying the batch or lot number with the tested charge weight to generate appropriate reaction pressure in intended cartridges.

Improvements 
Orders from countries fighting World War I required determining charges for different European military rifle cartridges, and production volume supported research for improvements. Improved military rifle propellants included a longitudinal perforation converting each grain to a tube with a progressive burning interior surface allowing a more consistent gas generation rate through the reaction period. Early propellants were identified by a two-digit number. As the number of experimental variations increased, each improved military rifle propellant was identified by a four-digit number. In addition to the canisters available from DuPont, the Director of Civilian Marksmanship (DCM) sold surplus improved military rifle propellants to members of the National Rifle Association. By 1936 improved DuPont process control produced batches conforming to published reloading data rather than requiring different charge specifications for each batch; and those propellants have remained in production. Non-conforming batches were used to load commercial and military cartridges following traditional testing procedures.

World War II 
Wartime temporarily interrupted production of civilian specification propellants, as major quantities of new specifications were manufactured. Number 4831 was used to load navy anti-aircraft machine gun ammunition, and number 4895 was used to load United States service rifle ammunition. As these propellants became military surplus after the war, large quantities of different batches were blended together to make products with uniform average performance for sale to civilians. Manufacture of these specifications for civilian use resumed after military surplus had been exhausted; but reaction characteristics were slightly different from the products distributed from military surplus supplies.

Specification numbers 

IMR® is a registered trademark of the IMR Powder Company assigned to the Hodgdon Powder Company, which markets powders under that name.

See also
Hodgdon Powder Company
Smokeless powder
Handloading

Sources

Notes

External links
IMR powders

Explosives
Firearm propellants